Jon Andoni 'Jonan' García Aranbillet (born 8 January 1983) is a Spanish former professional footballer who played as a midfielder.

Club career
Born in Bilbao, Biscay, García was a product of Athletic Bilbao's famed youth academy at Lezama, making his first-team debut on 30 August 2003 in a 0–1 La Liga home loss against FC Barcelona where he came on as a 76th-minute substitute. As the Basque side eventually finished fifth and qualified for the UEFA Cup, most of his appearances were made from the bench; he scored his first goal as a professional in a rare start, but in a 1–2 home defeat to Racing de Santander also at San Mamés, on 30 November 2003.

García featured even less in the 2004–05 season, being released subsequently and spending two years in the Segunda División, with CD Castellón and Ciudad de Murcia. He did not finish 2006–07 in Spain, having a six-month spell with Aris Thessaloniki F.C. in the Super League Greece.

García then returned to his country and played in the Segunda División B, with SE Eivissa-Ibiza, his solid performances earning him a return to the second division in January 2009 where he was very important in helping SD Huesca to retain their league status, 57 years after the last visit.

In the following years, García resumed his career in the third tier, returning to division two for the 2011–12 campaign with CD Guadalajara.

Honours
Spain U19
UEFA European Under-19 Championship: 2002

References

External links

1983 births
Living people
Spanish footballers
Footballers from Bilbao
Association football midfielders
La Liga players
Segunda División players
Segunda División B players
Tercera División players
CD Basconia footballers
Bilbao Athletic footballers
Athletic Bilbao footballers
CD Castellón footballers
Ciudad de Murcia footballers
SD Huesca footballers
UE Lleida players
Écija Balompié players
CD Guadalajara (Spain) footballers
Deportivo Alavés players
Super League Greece players
Aris Thessaloniki F.C. players
AEL Kalloni F.C. players
Cypriot First Division players
Othellos Athienou F.C. players
Spain youth international footballers
Spain under-21 international footballers
Spanish expatriate footballers
Expatriate footballers in Greece
Expatriate footballers in Cyprus
Spanish expatriate sportspeople in Greece
Spanish expatriate sportspeople in Cyprus